The Vammelsuu–Taipale line was a Finnish defensive line on the Karelian Isthmus built in 1942–1944 during the Continuation War and running from Vammelsuu on the northern shore of the Gulf of Finland through Kuuterselkä and Kivennapa and along Taipaleenjoki to Taipale on the western shore of Lake Ladoga. It crossed the Saint Petersburg–Vyborg railroad at Sahakylä (now 63rd km) and the Saint Petersburg–Hiitola railroad at Kelliö (now 69th km).

See also 
 VKT-line
 Karelian Fortified Region
 Salpa Line

Continuation War
World War II defensive lines